Ralph Griffith may refer to:

 Ralph T. H. Griffith (1826–1906), scholar of indology
 Ralph Griffith (Indian Army officer) (1882–1963), administrator in British India
 Ralph Griffiths (c.1720–1803), English journal editor and publisher
 Ralph A. Griffiths, historian and academic